The 2020 Las Vegas Aces season is the franchise's 24th season in the Women's National Basketball Association (WNBA) and the 3rd year the franchise was based in Las Vegas. The regular season tipped off on July 26, 2020 versus the Chicago Sky.

This WNBA season would’ve had an all-time high 36 regular-season games. However, the plan for expanded games was put on hold on April 3, when the WNBA postponed its season due to the COVID-19 pandemic. Under a plan approved on June 15, the league began a shortened 22-game regular season at IMG Academy, without fans present, which started on July 24.

The Aces got off to a rough start to their season, losing two of their first three games.  However, from there, the team would go on a seven-game winning streak and four game winning streak, only separated by a single loss.  Their 12–3 record on August 29, would secure them a playoff birth.  They lost on September 1, and that would be their last loss of the season.  The Aces finished on a six-game winning streak, including a final day victory over the Seattle Storm to finish 18–4.  The victory on the final day of the season secured them the first seed in the playoffs by virtue of a tie-breaker.

As the first seed, the Aces received a double-bye into the Semifinals of the playoffs.  In the Semifinals, they played the seventh seeded Connecticut Sun.  The Aces lost two of the first three games, but rebounded to win the final two games of the series to advance to the Finals.  In the finals they faced the second seeded Storm.  The Storm swept the best-of-five series three games to none, and the Aces finished runners up.

Transactions

WNBA draft 

The Aces will make the following selection in the 2020 WNBA draft.

Trades and roster changes

Roster

Game log

Regular season

|- style="background:#fcc;"
| 1
| July 26
| Chicago Sky
| L 86–88
| McCoughtry (25)
| Wilson (11)
| Allen (7)
| IMG Academy
| 0–1
|- style="background:#bbffbb;"
| 2
| July 29
| Atlanta Dream
| W 100-70
| Wilson (21)
| Wilson (11)
| Tied (3)
| IMG Academy
| 1–1
|- style="background:#fcc;"
| 3
| July 31
| Phoenix Mercury
| L 95–102
| McCoughtry (18)
| Wilson (8)
| Tied (4)
| IMG Academy
| 1–2

|- style="background:#bbffbb;"
| 4
| August 2
| Dallas Wings
| W 79–70
| Wilson (19)
| Tied (8)
| Hamby (4)
| IMG Academy
| 2–2
|- style="background:#bbffbb;"
| 5
| August 5
| Washington Mystics
| W 83–77
| Tied (20)
| Hamby (13)
| Robinson (3)
| IMG Academy
| 3–2
|- style="background:#bbffbb;"
| 6
| August 7
| Los Angeles Sparks
| W 86–82
| Wilson (26)
| Wilson (11)
| McCoughtry (5)
| IMG Academy
| 4–2
|- style="background:#bbffbb;"
| 7
| August 9
| New York Liberty
| W 78–76
| Wilson (31)
| Young (7)
| Tied (3)
| IMG Academy
| 5–2
|- style="background:#bbffbb;"
| 8
| August 11
| Indiana Fever
| W 98–79
| McCoughtry (20)
| Wilson (11)
| Tied (4)
| IMG Academy
| 6–2
|- style="background:#bbffbb;"
| 9
| August 13
| Minnesota Lynx
| W 87–77
| Wilson (23)
| Wilson (8)
| Allen (7)
| IMG Academy
| 7–2
|- style="background:#bbffbb;"
| 10
| August 15
| Washington Mystics
| W 88–73
| Young (16)
| Swords (7)
| Robinson (7)
| IMG Academy
| 8–2
|- style="background:#fcc;"
| 11
| August 18
| Chicago Sky
| L 82–84
| McCoughtry (17)
| Wilson (8)
| 3 tied (4)
| IMG Academy
| 8–3
|- style="background:#bbffbb;"
| 12
| August 20
| Connecticut Sun
| W 99–78
| McBride (25)
| McCoughtry (8)
| Robinson (9)
| IMG Academy
| 9–3
|- style="background:#bbffbb;"
| 13
| August 22
| Seattle Storm
| W 82–74
| Wilson (23)
| Tied (14)
| Robinson (7)
| IMG Academy
| 10–3
|- style="background:#bbffbb;"
| 14
| August 25
| Dallas Wings
| W 96–92
| Wilson (26)
| Hamby (14)
| Young (4)
| IMG Academy
| 11–3
|- style="background:#bbffbb;"
| 15
| August 29
| New York Liberty
| W 80–63
| Wilson (20)
| Hamby (10)
| Robinson (6)
| IMG Academy
| 12–3

|- style="background:#fcc;"
| 16
| September 1
| Phoenix Mercury
| L 85–92
| Young (20)
| Hamby (13)
| McBride (9)
| IMG Academy
| 12–4
|- style="background:#bbffbb;"
| 17
| September 3
| Connecticut Sun
| W 93–78
| Wilson (24)
| 3 tied (4)
| Young (9)
| IMG Academy
| 13–4
|- style="background:#bbffbb;"
| 18
| September 5
| Atlanta Dream
| W 89–79
| Wilson (21)
| Hamby (9)
| Young (6)
| IMG Academy
| 14–4
|- style="background:#bbffbb;"
| 19
| September 8
| Indiana Fever
| W 92–86
| Wilson (22)
| Wilson (16)
| Young (7)
| IMG Academy
| 15–4
|- style="background:#bbffbb;"
| 20
| September 10
| Minnesota Lynx
| W 104–89
| McCoughtry (22)
| Hamby (11)
| 3 tied (6)
| IMG Academy
| 16–4
|- style="background:#bbffbb;"
| 21
| September 12
| Los Angeles Sparks
| W 84–70
| Wilson (19)
| Wilson (8)
| McBride (6)
| IMG Academy
| 17–4
|- style="background:#bbffbb;"
| 22
| September 13
| Seattle Storm
| W 86–84
| Tied (23)
| Swords (8)
| Hamby (8)
| IMG Academy
| 18–4

Playoffs 

|- style="background:#fcc;"
| 1
| September 20
| Connecticut Sun
| L 62–87
| Wilson (19)
| Wilson (9)
| Tied (3)
| IMG Academy
| 0–1
|- style="background:#bbffbb;"
| 2
| September 22
| Connecticut Sun
| W 83–75
| Wilson (29)
| Wilson (7)
| Young (5)
| IMG Academy
| 1–1
|- style="background:#fcc;"
| 3
| September 24
| Connecticut Sun
| L 68–77
| Wilson (20)
| Wilson (12)
| Young (7)
| IMG Academy
| 1–2
|- style="background:#bbffbb;"
| 4
| September 27
| Connecticut Sun
| W 84–75
| McCoughtry (29)
| Wilson (13)
| McCoughtry (6)
| IMG Academy
| 2–2
|- style="background:#bbffbb;"
| 5
| September 29
| Connecticut Sun
| W 66–63
| Wilson (23)
| Wilson (11)
| Tied (4)
| IMG Academy
| 3–2

|- style="background:#fcc;"
| 1
| October 2
| Seattle Storm
| L 80–93
| McCoughtry (20)
| Swords (12)
| Tied (4)
| IMG Academy
| 0–1
|- style="background:#fcc;"
| 2
| October 4
| Seattle Storm
| L 91–104
| Wilson (20)
| McCoughtry (8)
| Robinson (10)
| IMG Academy
| 0–2
|- style="background:#fcc;"
| 3
| October 6
| Seattle Storm
| L 59–92
| Wilson (18)
| Swords (10)
| Wilson (4)
| IMG Academy
| 0–3

Standings

Playoffs

Statistics

Regular season

Awards and honors

References

External links 
 Official website of the Las Vegas Aces

Las Vegas Aces
Las Vegas Aces seasons
Las Vegas Aces